Sumika (written: ,  or ) is a feminine Japanese given name. Notable people with the name include:

, Japanese swimmer
, Japanese actress
, Japanese manga artist

Fictional characters
, a character in the visual novel series Muv-Luv
, protagonist of the manga series Sasameki Koto

Japanese feminine given names